is a Japanese voice actress and singer. Her debut voice acting role was Yukino Miyazawa from Kare Kano in 1998, which she auditioned for while still in high school. Her debut single was Be My Angel the opening theme of the 2001 anime Angelic Layer. 
She was affiliated with talent agency 81 Produce until 2015. 
Her former husband is voice actor Mark Ishii.  
In 2018, she discussed harassment in the industry and how she desperately wanted to quit in her first years as a voice actress.

Filmography

Television animation
{| class="wikitable sortable"
! Year || Title || Role || Notes
|-
| 1998 || Kare Kano || Yukino Miyazawa || 
|-
| rowspan="3" | 1999 || Kaikan Phrase || Aine Yukimura ||
|-
| The Legend of Black Heaven || Kotoko || 
|-
| Steel Angel Kurumi || Kurumi || 
|-
| rowspan="3" | 2000 || Baby Felix || Mimi ||
|-
| Argento Soma || Scarlet || 
|-
| Daa! Daa! Daa! || Aya Konishi ||
|-
| 2000 || Platinumhugen Ordian ||  Nanna ||
|-
| rowspan="5" | 2001 || Angelic Layer || Misaki Suzuhara ||
|-
| Captain Tsubasa: Road to 2002 || Sanae Nakazawa ||
|-
| Chance Pop Session || Yuki Aoyama || 
|-
| Hikaru no Go || Asumi Nase ||
|-
| The SoulTaker || Megumi Akiba ||
|-
| rowspan="3" | 2002 || .hack//SIGN || A-20 ||
|-
| Nurse Witch Komugi || Megumi Akiba ||
|-
| Panyo Panyo Di Gi Charat || Rinna Charat || 
|-
| 2002-2003 || Monkey Typhoon || Shiyon ||
|-
| rowspan="2" | 2003 || Di Gi Charat Nyo || Rinna Charat ||
|-
| Gunparade Orchestra || Tommi Fujino || 
|-
| 2004 || Ryusei Sentai Musumet || Marcia Saotome || 
|-
| rowspan="3" | 2005 || Glass Mask || Emi Tabuchi ||
|-
| Soreyuke! Gedou Otometai|| Otone Hokke ||
|-
| Starship Operators || Akiho Maya ||
|-
| rowspan="7" | 2006 || .hack//Roots || Bset || 
|-
| Bokura ga Ita || Ayaka Takeuchi ||
|-
| Futari wa Pretty Cure Splash Star || Mai Mishou/Cure Egret/Cure Windy (Speaking Voice) ||
|-
| Gintama || Otose (Young) ||
|-
| Gift: Eternal Rainbow || Sena Asakawa ||
|-
| Kagihime Monogatari Eikyuu Alice Rondo || Mika Ohgami ||
|-
| Clannad || Yukine Miyazawa ||
|-
| 2008 || Gunslinger Girl -Il Teatrino- || Triela ||
|-
| 2009 || Element Hunters || Chiara Ferina ||
|-
| 2011 || Cardfight!! Vanguard || Emi Sendō ||
|-
| 2013 || Line Town || Sally || 
|-
| 2014 || Bonjour♪Sweet Love Patisserie || Tsubaki Sannomiya || 
|-
| || Pokémon || Miki, Kurumi, Hinata ||
|-
|}

Original video animation (OVA)Amon: The Darkside of The Devilman (2000) – Miki MakimuraPuni Puni Poemy (2001; 2 episodes) – Mitsuki Aasu.hack//Unison (2002–2003; 3 episodes) – Mistral Netrun-mon (2004) – RannaCyborg 009 VS Devilman (2015) - SachikoLandreaall (2017) – Ion Lucafort

Video gamesMemories Off (1999) – Karin HanamatsuriStar Ocean: Till the End of Time (2003) – Sophia Esteed, Ameena LeffeldTomak: Save the Earth Love Story (2003) – EvianClannad Full Voice (2004) – Yukine MiyazawaFire Emblem: Path of Radiance (2005) – MistSummon Night EX: Thesis Yoake no Tsubasa (2005) – AinnaTsukiyo ni Saraba (2005) – Alice.hack//G.U. (2006) – Aina.hack/LINK (2010) – MistralFire Emblem Heroes (2017) - Mist: Helpful Sister, Mist: Purest Spirit Galaxy Angel II Mugen Kairō no Kagi – Natsume Izayoi.Hack'' series – Mistral

Dubbing

References

External links
 
Atsuko Enomoto at Ryu's Seiyuu Info

1979 births
Living people
Anime singers
Japanese video game actresses
Japanese voice actresses
Japanese radio personalities
Singers from Tokyo
Voice actresses from Tokyo Metropolis
21st-century Japanese singers
81 Produce voice actors